The Nybro Vikings is an ice-hockey club from Nybro in Sweden. The team was playing in the highest league  in Sweden for two seasons 1968–69 and 1969–70 and the second highest league during the 70s and 80s and again for seven years from 2002 to 2009 in Hockeyallsvenskan. The team was relegated to the third division, Division 1, during the 2008-2009 season after finishing only 15th in the regular season and only third in the following qualification series with six teams, two from Hockeyallsvenskan and four from Division 1.

The team currently plays in Liljas arena, which takes about  spectators. Liljas arena is the fourth oldest ice hockey arena in Sweden, finished 1963. 1984 the arena was rebuilt.

History
The ice hockey club in Nybro was founded 1939 as "IK Ymer", which 1955 joined the same organisation as the general sports club Nybro IF, and therefore also carried that name  until 1998 when it became independent as Nybro IF Hockey. The name changed to Nybro Vikings IF in 2002.
Among many seasons in the Swedish second division, the club has also played two seasons in the highest league during 1968–69 and 1969–70. Club chairman Evald Carlsson was during the 50s and 60s an important personality in Swedish ice hockey and among other things was the driving force behind Nybro getting the fourth indoor hockey arena in Sweden in 1963.

Fredrik Olausson, a member of the 2002 Stanley Cup champion Detroit Red Wings, started his career with Nybro.

Björn "Böna" Johansson, who played for Nybro IF from 1968 to 1971, played 113 games for the Swedish national team between 1972 and 1976 and is the player with the 87th most games for the Tre Kronor. During his national career he played 5 IIHF World Championship's and 1 Canada Cup. He then played 6 seasons for Södertälje SK in Elitserien, and in 1977 returned to Nybro, where he ended his career in 1983.

Nybro currently plays in Hockeyettan in Sweden.

Supporters

The supporter club of Nybro Vikings is called Viking Support.

References

External links

Official homepage
Official homepage of the supporter club

Ice hockey teams in Sweden
Ice hockey teams in Kalmar County